The Embassy of Japan in Ottawa ( Zai Kanada Nihon-koku Taishikan) is the diplomatic mission of Japan in Canada. Since 1978 the chancery has been located at 255 Sussex Drive near the Lester B. Pearson Building in Ottawa, Ontario. The ambassadorial residence is at Waterstone (Alan Keefer, architect, built 1928-31), one of Ottawa's largest mansions in Rockcliffe Park. Japan first opened a consulate in Vancouver in 1889 and the embassy opened in 1928. With the outbreak of war, the Japanese diplomats were expelled in 1941 and the embassy was not reopened until 1951. The embassy today also has consulates in Vancouver, Toronto, Montreal, and Calgary.

The current ambassador is Yasuhisa Kawamura (川村 泰久 Kawamura Yasuhisa).

External links
Official website of the Embassy
The Embassy on Facebook
The Embassy on Twitter

Japan
Ottawa
Canada–Japan relations
Sussex Drive